Different Like You is the fourth full-length album by Australian garage rock band Rocket Science. It was produced by guitarist Paul Maybury and recorded at the Maybury's newly established studio, Secret Location Studios. Following their departure from the Modular Recordings label was released on new Australian label – High Spot Recordings – on 26 July 2008.

An Australian tour in May 2008 revolved around the release of the first single "Psychic Man".

Track listing
"Sinful Cowboy" – 3:24 (Tucker/Warhurst/Rocket Science)
"Psychic Man" – 4:04 (Gray/Warhurst/Rocket Science)
"With You I'll Be Someone" – 2:52 (Tucker/Warhurst/Rocket Science)
"Different Like Everybody Else" – 3:00 (Blampied/Tucker/Rocket Science)
"Weekly Dreams" – 3:17 (Tucker/Warhurst/Rocket Science)
"Jukebox Junkie" – 2:34 (Gray/Tucker/Rocket Science)
"Talking To Machines" – 3:13 (Tucker/Warhurst/Rocket Science)
"The Clones" – 4:12 (Tucker/Warhurst/Rocket Science)
"Love Love Love" – 2:21 (Warhurst/Rocket Science)
"Alive" – 3:27 (Tucker/Warhurst/Rocket Science)

References

External links
Rocket Science on Myspace

2008 albums
Rocket Science (band) albums